Jaismine Lamboria (born 30 August 2001) is an Indian boxer who competes in lightweight category. She participated in the 2022 Commonwealth Games in Birmingham where she won a bronze medal.

Early life
Lamboria hails from a family of boxers. Her great grandfather Hawa Singh was a heavyweight boxer and two-time Asian Games gold medalist. Her grandfather  Hony.Captain Chander Bhan lamboriya was a wrestler. She was trained by her uncles Sandeep Singh and Parvinder Singh who were also national champions in boxing.

References

External links
 

2001 births
Living people
Indian women boxers
Lightweight boxers
People from Bhiwani district
Boxers from Haryana
Sportswomen from Haryana
Boxers at the 2022 Commonwealth Games
Commonwealth Games bronze medallists for India
Commonwealth Games medallists in boxing
21st-century Indian women
Medallists at the 2022 Commonwealth Games